A tweeter is a loudspeaker designed to produce high frequencies.

Tweeter may also refer to:

 Tweeter, an active user of the website Twitter
 Tweeter (store), a defunct electronics retail chain in the United States
 Tweeter Center (disambiguation), the former name of several buildings

See also
 "Tweeter And The Monkey Man", a song by the Traveling Wilburys
 Super tweeter
 Soft dome tweeter
 Tweet (disambiguation)